The True Story of Ah Q is a 1981 Chinese drama film directed by Fan Cen. It was entered into the 1982 Cannes Film Festival. It is based on the 1921-22 novella of the same name by Lu Xun.

Cast
 Bao Fumin as Master Zhao's son
 Chen Xi as Candidate Bai
 Jin Yikang as The Fake Foreign Devil
 Li Wei
 Ni Yilan as Zou Qi Sao
 Wang Suya
 Yan Shunkai as A Qiu
 Zhang Youyun as The Little Nun

References

External links

1981 films
1981 drama films
Chinese drama films
Films based on short fiction
1980s Mandarin-language films
Shanghai Film Studio films
Adaptations of works by Lu Xun